Tomchei Tmimim ("supporters of the complete-wholesome ones") is the central Yeshiva (Talmudical academy) of the Chabad-Lubavitch Hasidic movement. Founded in 1897 in the town of Lubavitch by Rabbi Sholom Dovber Schneersohn, it is now an international network of institutions of advanced Torah study, the United Lubavitcher Yeshivoth.

History 

As above, Tomechei Tmimim was founded in 1897 in Lubavitch, by Rabbi Sholom DovBer Schneersohn for the study of Hasidic philosophy according to the Chabad tradition, in parallel with the traditional Yeshiva curriculum. Here, Rabbi Schneersohn authored Kuntres Eitz HaChayim,  guidelines and standards for a student's learning goals and schedule, personal conduct, prayer, and appearance.
Correspondingly, he called the students of this yeshiva "tmimim" (sing. "tomim" תמים = pure, perfect).

 
When Rabbi Yosef Yitzchok Schneersohn left the Soviet Union in 1927, the yeshiva reestablished itself in Warsaw and later in Otwock, Poland.  In the course of World War II, the yeshiva escaped to Shanghai, China, along with some other yeshivot like Mir.

Once the Rebbe was safely evacuated to New York, the Yeshiva was reestablished in New York City, where it remains to this day.
Within 24 hours  the Rebbe had opened a yeshiva branch. Starting with 10 students, the Yeshiva quickly grew to the extent that it expanded to other nearby locations, giving rise to the group known as "United Lubavitcher Yeshivas"; see next section.
Rabbi Yisroel Yitzchok Piekarski was the Rosh Yeshiva for 42 years, from 1951 until 1993.

Today 

The central Yeshiva is housed today at the Chabad Lubavitch World Headquarters, at 770 Eastern Parkway in Brooklyn, NY, with approximately six hundred students. 
Similarly named yeshivas, many of which are nevertheless formally independent, are to be found in major cities in the United States, Canada, Europe, South America, South Africa, Australia, and the former Soviet Union, and Israel. 
(Not all carry the name "Tomchei Tmimim" however.)

Many of the branches also perform the functions necessary to grant Semicha, rabbinical ordination, to their students;

 
true since the 1950's for the majority of students.
Some affiliated institutions  (often essentially “post-graduate”) specifically focus on Rabbinical training, with the Semicha correspondingly requiring further depth and breadth.

A significant number of graduates of Tomchei Tmimim continue working within Chabad as religious functionaries, whether as shluchim in Chabad Houses or as teachers in schools.
Graduates - usually of the latter institutions mentioned - also often work as "community Rabbis" more broadly.

Global locations

In North America 
 The Central Lubavitcher Yeshiva, or Central Yeshiva Tomchei Tmimim Lubavitch, 885 Eastern Parkway, Brooklyn, New York
 United Lubavitcher Yeshivoth - Ocean Parkway, Brooklyn, New York
 Talmudical Seminary Oholei Torah, Brooklyn, New York
 Mesivta Yeshivas Tomchei Tmimim Lubavitch Queens Forest Hills, New York
 Yeshivas Tomchei Tmimim Lubavitch Poconos Canadensis, PA
 Yeshiva Kol Yaakov Yehuda Hadar Hatorah Rabbinical Seminary, Brooklyn, New York
 Yeshivas Lubavitch Cincinnati, Cincinnati, Ohio.
 Yeshivas Lubavitch Toronto, Toronto, Ontario, Canada
 Yeshiva Or Menachem, Montreal, Quebec, Canada
 Rabbinical College of America, Morristown, New Jersey 
 Lubavitch Educational Center – Klurman Mesivta, Miami Beach, Florida
 Yeshivas Lubavitch of Baltimore, Baltimore, Maryland
 Yeshiva Ohr Elchonon Chabad/West Coast Talmudical Seminary, Los Angeles, California
 Oholei Yosef Yitzchok Lubavitch-Mesivta, Oak Park, Michigan
 Yeshivas Menachem Mendel Lubavitch of Monsey, NY
 Yeshivas Beis Dovid Shlomo, New Haven, CT
 Yeshiva Boys’ High School, Pittsburgh, PA
 Lubavitch Mesivta of Chicago, Chicago, IL
 Central Lubavitch Yeshiva, Chovevei Torah, Brooklyn, New York
 Lubavitch Rabbinical College of Minnesota, S. Paul, MN
 Mesivta of Postville, Postville, IA
 Mesivta of Coral Springs, Coral Springs, FL
 Albany Mesivta, Albany, New York
 HaMesivta, Ocean Parkway, Brooklyn, New York
 Mesivta Oholei Torah, Brooklyn, New York
 Yeshiva Mesivta Menachem, Westchester, New York
 Yeshiva Torah Ohr, Miami, FL
 Yeshiva Gedolah of Greater Miami Rabbinical College, Miami, Florida
 Yeshivas Menachem Mendel Lubavitch, Oak Park, MI
 Rabbinical College of Canada Quebec-Tomchei Tmimim Lubavitch Bais Medrash, Montreal, Quebec, Canada
 Kingston Mesivta, Kingston, Pennsylvania

In Israel 
 Yeshivat Tomchei Tmimim HaMerkazit (Central Tomchei Temimim Yeshiva), Kfar Chabad
 Yeshivat Tomchei Tmimim Lubavitch Rishon LeZion (Ketana), Rishon Lezion
 Yeshivat Tomchei Tmimim Lubavitch Rishon LeZion (Gedola), Rishon LeZion
 Yeshivat Tomchei Tmimim Lubavitch Nachlat Har Chabad, Kiryat Malachi
 Yeshiva Tomchei Tmimim, Lod
 Yeshivat Ohr Tmimim, Kfar Chabad
 Yeshivas Tzeirei Hashluchim, Safed
 Yeshivas Chasidei Chabad Beis Levi Yitzchak, Safed
 Ohr Simcha, Kfar Chabad
 Beis Sefer Lemelacha, Kfar Chabad
 Tomchei Tmimim Kiryat Gat, Kiryat Gat
 Yeshivas Toras Emes, Jerusalem (founded in 1911, also by Rabbi Sholom Dovber Schneersohn, and originally based in Hebron)
 Yeshivat NachlatHar Chabad Beit Haram, Kiryat Malachi
 Yeshivat Tomchei Tmimim Migdal HaEmek, Migdal HaEmek
 Yeshivas Tomchei Tmimim, Or Yehuda
 Yeshivas Tomchei Tmimim, El'ad
 Yeshivas Tomchei Tmimimm, Beersheba
 Yeshivas Ohel Menachem, Beit Shemesh
 Yeshivas Tomchei Tmimim, Beitar Illit
 Yeshivas Tomchei Tmimim-Beis Menachem, Bnei Brak

In other locations 
 Yeshivas Oholei Yosef Yitchak Lubavitch, S. Kilda East, Australia 
 Rabbinical College of Australia and New Zealand, East S. Kilda, Victoria, Australia
 Yeshivas Levi Yitzchak S. Kilda East, Victoria Australia
 Yeshiva Gedolah Rabbinical College of Sydney, Bondi, New South Wales, Australia
 Yeshiva College Cheder Chabad-High School Division, Bondi, New South Wales, Australia
 Yeshivas Tomchei Tmimim, Brunoy, France (suburb of Paris)
 Yeshiva Tomchei Tmimim Vincennes, France
 Yeshiva Gedolah Lubavitch London
 Lubavitch Mechinah L'Yeshiva, London, England
 Yeshivas Lubavitch Manchester, Manchester, England
 Boys High School Mesivta, Moscow, Russia
 Yeshiva Ketana Tomchei Tmimim Lubavitch, Moscow, Russia
 Yeshivah Tomchei Tmimim Lubavitch, Moscow, Russia
 Yeshiva Ketana Tomchei Tmimim Lubavitch, Saint-Petersburg, Russia
 Lubavitch Yeshiva Gedolah of Johannesburg, South Africa
 Rabbinical College of Pretoria, South Africa
 Torah Academy School, Johannesburg, South Africa
 Yeshiva Gedola, Buenos Aires, Argentina
 Yeshiva Tomchei Tmimim Lubavitch Ohel Menachem, S. Paulo, Brazil
 Yeshiva Gedola Nachlas Levi, Dnipro, Ukraine
 Yeshiva Gedolah Frankfurt, Germany
 Rabbinical Yeshiva, Venice, Italy

Notable alumni
Meir Ashkenazi, Chief rabbi of Shanghai in early 1900s
Moshe Gutnick, president of the Rabbinical Council of Australia and New Zealand
Abraham Hecht, former president of the Rabbinical Alliance of America
Simon Jacobson, author of Toward a Meaningful Life
Yosef Yitzchak Jacobson, public lecturer
Yoel Kahan, scholar of Hasidic philosophy
Berel Lazar, Chief rabbi of Russia
Yehoshua Mondshine, researcher and historian
Nissan Nemanov, director of the Tomchei Temimim Yeshiva in Brunoy, France
Shlomo Sawilowsky, professor at Wayne State University
Eliyahu Simpson, rabbi
Marcus Solomon, Supreme Court Justice in Western Australia
Adin Steinsaltz, scholar and author of the Steinsaltz Talmud

See also
Beth Rivkah - Chabad’s education network for women

References 

Chabad yeshivas
1897 establishments in the Russian Empire